Zodarion bosmansi is a species of spider found in Portugal. It is usually black or brown with orange-brown legs.

See also 
 List of Zodariidae species

References

External links 

bosmansi
Spiders described in 2005
Spiders of Europe
Fauna of Portugal